Mario Matt (born 9 April 1979) is an Austrian former World Cup alpine ski racer and Olympic gold medalist.

Slalom racing career 
Born in Zams, Tyrol, Matt made his World Cup debut in December 1999. He claimed 15 World Cup victories: 14 in slalom and one super combined. Matt is also a two-time world champion in slalom, with titles in 2001 and 2007. With a remarkably long career as a top slalom racer, he is the second oldest (after André Myhrer, who won gold in 2018) to win an Olympic gold medal in slalom skiing (in Sochi at the 2014 Winter olympics) and also the second oldest (after Dave Ryding) to win a (regular) World Cup slalom race. Matt also has the third longest time interval between first and last World Cup victories (13 years, 10 months, and 22 days), after Ingemar Stenmark and Didier Cuche.

Matt announced his retirement from ski racing on 12 March 2015.

World Cup results

Season standings

Race victories

 15 wins – (14 SL, 1 SC)
 42 podiums – (40 SL, 1 GS, 1 SC)

World Championships results

Olympic results

Business career 
In 2009, Matt purchased the Krazy Kanguruh bar at the Arlberg resort St. Anton.  He also runs a stable where he breeds Arabian horses.

Personal
Matt is the brother of skicross competitor and Olympic silver winner Andreas Matt and fellow alpine skier Michael Matt.

See also
List of Olympic medalist families

References

External links
 
 
  

1979 births
Austrian male alpine skiers
Alpine skiers at the 2006 Winter Olympics
Alpine skiers at the 2014 Winter Olympics
Olympic alpine skiers of Austria
Medalists at the 2014 Winter Olympics
Olympic medalists in alpine skiing
Olympic gold medalists for Austria
Sportspeople from Tyrol (state)
People from Zams
Living people
Recipients of the Decoration of Honour for Services to the Republic of Austria
20th-century Austrian people
21st-century Austrian people